Christ Church is an historic Episcopal church and cemetery located at 3rd and Church Streets in Milford, Kent County, Delaware. The original section was started in 1791, with construction continuing until 1835. Between 1863 and 1894, the church underwent several alterations and additions.  It is a brick structure in the Gothic Revival style.  The adjacent cemetery has a number of notable burials including Delaware governors William Burton (1789–1866), Peter F. Causey (1801–1871), and William Tharp (1803–1865).

It was added to the National Register of Historic Places in 1973.

References

18th-century Episcopal church buildings
Episcopal church buildings in Delaware
Churches in Kent County, Delaware
Churches completed in 1835
Churches on the National Register of Historic Places in Delaware
Milford, Delaware
19th-century Episcopal church buildings
National Register of Historic Places in Kent County, Delaware
Individually listed contributing properties to historic districts on the National Register in Delaware